Rayna Gellert (born December 15, 1975) is an American fiddler, acoustic guitarist, singer, and songwriter specializing in old-time music. She grew up in Elkhart, in northern Indiana, formerly lived in Asheville, North Carolina, and is currently based in Nashville, Tennessee. Her father is the traditional fiddler, banjo player, and singer Dan Gellert. Originally a classically trained violinist, she took up the old-time fiddle in 1994, when she moved to North Carolina to attend Warren Wilson College. She received a bachelor's degree from Warren Wilson College.

Gellert is a former member of the Freight Hoppers. From 2003 to 2009 she performed and recorded with the all-female old-time band Uncle Earl. In 2003, she was a featured performer at the Smithsonian Folklife Festival. She has also performed with the dance company Rhythm in Shoes, the West African-influenced band Toubab Krewe, Abigail Washburn, and Scott Miller. She has toured throughout the United States, Europe, and Chile.

She has been a finalist at the Appalachian String Band Music Festival in Clifftop, Fayette County, West Virginia several times.

Early life

Gellert is the daughter of Dan Gellert, an old-time banjo and fiddle player. Gellert grew up in northern Indiana.

Career

Gellert has played and recorded with Abigail Washburn, Loudon Wainwright III, Tyler Ramsey, Robyn Hitchcock, and others. She has appeared at music festivals including Bonnaroo, Telluride Bluegrass Festival, and RockyGrass.

Instruments

Gellert plays a fiddle that belonged to her great-grandfather, a Hungarian orchestral musician, and guitar.

Discography

As leader
2000 - Ways of the World
2012 - Old Light- Songs from my Childhood & Other Gone Worlds
2017 - Workin's Too Hard

With Uncle Earl
2004 - Going to the Western Slope (EP)
2004 - Raise A Ruckus (EP)
2005 - She Waits For Night (Rounder)
2007 - Waterloo, Tennessee (Rounder)

With Susie Goehring
2005 - Starch & IronWith Scott Miller
2012 - CoDependents (EP)

With The Brothers K
2015 - Rayna Gellert & the Brothers K (EP)With Kieran Kane
2018 - The Ledges2019 - When the Sun Goes Down2022 - The Flowers That Bloom in Spring''

References

External links
Rayna Gellert's website
Rayna Gellert MySpace page
Rayna Gellert bio
Rayna Gellert interview

Old-time musicians
Living people
Appalachian old-time fiddlers
Musicians from Asheville, North Carolina
People from Elkhart, Indiana
1975 births
21st-century violinists
Uncle Earl members
Old-time fiddlers
American fiddlers
American women singer-songwriters
Singers from Nashville, Tennessee
Singer-songwriters from Tennessee
21st-century American women
Singer-songwriters from Indiana
Singer-songwriters from North Carolina